Lipophaga is a genus of gylippid camel spiders, first described by William Frederick Purcell in 1903.

Species 
, the World Solifugae Catalog accepts the following three species:

 Lipophaga kraepelini Roewer, 1933 — Namibia
 Lipophaga schultzei (Kraepelin, 1908) — South Africa
 Lipophaga trispinosa Purcell, 1903 — South Africa

References 

Arachnid genera
Solifugae